Tahoe Smokeless is a brand of smokeless tobacco. They are a product from the Bailey's Cigarettes and the Rock Ridge Tobacco Company. They are a predominant figure in the field of sports sponsorship, funding various fishing and angling tournaments, and formerly as the #18 Dodge Ram driven by Dennis Setzer in the Craftsman Truck Series.

External links 
Official Website

Companies based in Virginia
Tobacco brands
Tobacco companies of the United States